The Colne Community School and College is a secondary school and sixth form with academy status located in Brightlingsea, Essex, England. The school is an inclusive, comprehensive provider that achieved academy status in 2011 and founded the Thrive Partnership along with the Philip Morant School and College. In 2018 the Thrive Partnership was dissolved and the Colne joined the Sigma Trust in 2018.

History
 Founded on 24 May 1937 as Brightlingsea Senior School
 Changed name in 1943 to Brightlingsea Secondary Modern School
 Changed name in 1957 to Brightlingsea County Secondary School
 Changed name in 1974 to Colne High School
 Changed name in 1991 to Colne School
 Changed name in 1994 to Colne Community School
 Changed name in 2008 to The Colne Community School and College
 Joined the Thrive Partnership in 2011 
 Joined the Sigma Trust in 2018

Sports facilities
The Colne Community School's AstroTurf pitch was officially opened The Princess Anne on 25 February 2003. The campus contains Brightlingsea Sports Centre which is used by members of the public and students. This includes tennis, basketball and netball courts.

References

External links 
Official site
Google Map

Educational institutions established in 1937
Academies in Essex
Secondary schools in Essex
1937 establishments in England
Brightlingsea